Tarali Sarma (Assamese: তৰালি শৰ্মা) is an Indian singer from Assam, who won the National Film Award for Best Female Playback Singer in the year 2003 for the Assamese film Akashitorar Kothare. Her father was Prabhat Sarma who was a folk exponent, flutist, music director and a Sangeet Natak Akademi Awardee. Tarali is a versatile singer and music director in the Assamese film industry. She has composed music for films like Akashitorar Kothare, Laaz, Jatra the passage, Basundhara and Abhijatri, among others. She has also released several albums such as Abhixari Priya, Sonjoni, Sankar Madhav, Sneh, Pohar, Tarali, Henguliya and Bargit. Tarali's album list also includes Abhimaan, Prajapati, Nayanmoni (with Krishnamani Nath), Mukoli etc.

Tarali Sarma performed in Valley Forge in Pennsylvania during Assam 2009 organized by Assam Society of America. She also performed  in Colorado Springs, Colorado during Assam 2010 organized by Assam Society of America.

Tarali Sarma is the music director of “Life in a Puppet”, an Assamese movie, that has bagged several awards at the Port Blair International Film Festival. She also made the music for ‘Xubala’, an Assamese movie, which has been selected to be screened in Lift-off Sessions Film Festival 2020, UK and Lift-off Sessions Film Festival 2020, Hollywood.

Awards 
 Best Female Playback Singer in 51st National Film Awards (2003).

References

External links
 Tarali Sarma's Official Website
Tarali Sarma on Instagram
Tarali Sarma at IMDb

Living people
Indian pop singers
Indian women classical singers
Indian women pop singers
Assamese singers
Assamese playback singers
Indian women composers
Singers from Assam
Indian women playback singers
1975 births
Best Female Playback Singer National Film Award winners
Women musicians from Assam
21st-century Indian women singers
21st-century Indian singers